The Anatomy of Melancholy (full title: The Anatomy of Melancholy, What it is: With all the Kinds, Causes, Symptomes, Prognostickes, and Several Cures of it. In Three Maine Partitions with their several Sections, Members, and Subsections. Philosophically, Medicinally, Historically, Opened and Cut Up) is a book by Robert Burton, first published in 1621, but republished five more times over the next seventeen years with massive alterations and expansions.

Overview 
On its surface, the book is presented as a medical textbook in which Burton applies his vast and varied learning, in the scholastic manner, to the subject of melancholia (or clinical depression). Although presented as a medical text, The Anatomy of Melancholy is as much a sui generis (unique) work of literature as it is a scientific or philosophical text, as Burton covers far more than the nomitive subject. Anatomy uses melancholy as a lens through which all human emotion and thought may be scrutinized, and virtually the entire contents of a 17th-century library are marshalled into service of this goal. It is encyclopedic in its range and reference.

In his satirical preface to the reader, Burton's persona and pseudonym "Democritus Junior" explains, "I write of melancholy by being busy to avoid melancholy." This is characteristic of the author's style, which often supersedes the book's strengths as a medical text or historical document as its main source of appeal to admirers. Both satirical and serious in tone, the Anatomy is "vitalized by (Burton's) pervading humour", and Burton's digressive and inclusive style, often verging on a stream of consciousness, consistently informs and animates the text. In addition to the author's techniques, the Anatomys vast breadth – addressing topics such as digestion, goblins, the geography of America, and others – make it a valuable contribution to multiple disciplines.

Publication 
Burton was an obsessive editor of his own work, publishing five revised and expanded editions of The Anatomy of Melancholy during his lifetime. It has often been out of print, particularly between 1676 and 1800. Because no original manuscript of the Anatomy has survived, later reprints have drawn more or less faithfully from the editions published during Burton's life. Early editions have entered the public domain, with several available from online sources such as Project Gutenberg. In recent decades, increased interest in the book, combined with its public domain status, has resulted in new print editions, most recently a 2001 reprinting of the 1932 edition by The New York Review of Books under its NYRB Classics imprint.

Synopsis 
Burton defined his subject as:

In expounding on his subject, Burton drew from nearly every science of his day, including psychology and physiology, but also astronomy, meteorology, theology, and even astrology and demonology.

Much of the book quotes ancient and medieval medical authorities, beginning with Hippocrates, Aristotle, and Galen. Hence the Anatomy is filled with more or less pertinent references to the works of others. A competent Latinist, Burton included a great deal of Latin poetry in the Anatomy, much of it from ancient sources left untranslated.

The Anatomy of Melancholy is especially lengthy, the first edition being a single quarto volume nearly 900 pages long; subsequent editions were even longer. The text has three major sections plus an introduction, written in Burton's sprawling style. Characteristically, the introduction includes not only an author's note (titled "Democritus Junior to the Reader"), but also a Latin poem ("Democritus Junior to His Book"), a warning to "The Reader Who Employs His Leisure Ill", an abstract of the following text, and another poem explaining the frontispiece. The following three sections proceed in a similarly exhaustive fashion: the first section focuses on the causes and symptoms of "common" melancholies, the second section deals with cures for melancholy, and the third section explores more complex and esoteric melancholies, including the melancholy of lovers and all manner of religious melancholies. The Anatomy concludes with an extensive index (which The New York Times Book Review called "a readerly pleasure in itself"). Most modern editions add explanatory notes and translate most of the Latin.

Critical reception 
Admirers of The Anatomy of Melancholy range from Samuel Johnson, Holbrook Jackson (whose Anatomy of Bibliomania [1930] was based on the style and presentation), George Armstrong Custer, Charles Lamb and John Keats (who said it was his favourite book) to Northrop Frye, Stanley Fish, Philip Pullman, Cy Twombly, Jorge Luis Borges (who used a quote as an epigraph to his story "The Library of Babel"), O. Henry (William Sidney Porter), Amalia Lund, William Gass (who wrote the Introduction to the NYRB Classics 2001 reprint), Nick Cave, Samuel Beckett and Jacques Barzun (who sees it anticipating 20th-century psychiatry). According to The Guardian literary critic Nick Lezard, the Anatomy "survives among the cognoscenti". Washington Irving quotes from it on the title page of The Sketch Book.

Burton's solemn tone and his endeavour to prove indisputable facts by weighty quotations were ridiculed by Laurence Sterne in Tristram Shandy. Sterne also mocked Burton's divisions in the titles of his chapters, and parodied his grave and sober account of Cicero's grief for the death of his daughter Tullia.

Notes

References 
 Ferriar, John (1798) Illustrations of Sterne
 Petrie, Graham (1970) A Rhetorical Topic in "Tristram Shandy", Modern Language Review, Vol. 65, No. 2, April 1970, pp. 261–66

Further reading 
 Edward W. Adams (1896). "Robert Burton and the 'Anatomy of Melancholy'," The Gentleman's Magazine, Vol. CCLXXXI, pp. 46–53
  The introduction by author William H. Gass runs just under 10 pages
 Mary Ann Lund (2010). "Melancholy, Medicine and Religion in Early Modern England: Reading The Anatomy of Melancholy". Cambridge University Press
 Susan Wells (2019). Robert Burton's Rhetoric: An Anatomy of Early Modern Knowledge. Pennsylvania State University Press

External links

Online editions 
 The 1638 edition on Google Books
 
 The Anatomy of Melancholy Online reading and multiple ebook formats at Ex-classics
 The Anatomy of Melancholy at Making of America
 The Anatomy of Melancholy at PsyPlexus
 The Anatomy of Melancholy at Internet Archive – scan of 1896 edition
 The Anatomy of Melancholy at LibriVox (public domain audiobooks)

Discussions of the book 
 "The Anatomy of Melancholy" In Our Time episode from BBC Radio 4
 The New Anatomy of Melancholy – BBC Radio 4 exploration and modern extrapolation
 The Complete Review discussion of The Anatomy of Melancholy

1621 books
Works about melancholia
Books about depression
NYRB Classics
Medical textbooks
Philosophy books